Transylvania 6-5000 is a 1985 American/Yugoslav horror comedy film about two tabloid reporters who travel to modern-day Transylvania to uncover the truth behind Frankenstein sightings. Along the way, they encounter other horror film staples — a mummy, a werewolf, a vampire — each with a twist.

Written and directed by Rudy De Luca, the film stars Jeff Goldblum, Ed Begley Jr., Joseph Bologna, and Geena Davis. Notable other cast include Michael Richards, Carol Kane, Teresa Ganzel, John Byner, and Jeffrey Jones.

The title is a pun on "Pennsylvania 6-5000", a song made famous by Glenn Miller.

Plot
Jack Harrison (Jeff Goldblum) and Gil Turner (Ed Begley Jr.) are writers for The Sensation, a supermarket-grade tabloid run by Turner's father, Mac Turner (Norman Fell). Jack is a more serious journalist, using The Sensation as a stepping stone to a better career and aspires to work for Time magazine, while Gil is a gangling yes-man, ever ready to win his father's approval.

When Mac receives a homemade videotape of two panicked men running from a creature they believe to be Frankenstein's monster, along with a waist-down shot of the suspected monster, he dispatches his son and Jack to Transylvania to follow the lead. Jack tries unsuccessfully to beg off, but is told by Mac that if they both again come back with nothing, they are both fired. They have to bring a story that will bring a banner headline "Frankenstein Lives!"

Planes, trains and buses later, Jack and Gil arrive at their destination. Once off the bus, Jack immediately spots Elizabeth Ellison, a pretty female tourist (Teresa Ganzel) from New York City, whom he propositions. Gil immediately sets out on their assignment, just as quickly drawing hysterical ridicule when he tries to question a hotel desk clerk about the whereabouts of Frankenstein, who shares Gil's inquiries with the staff and patrons, including the mayor Lepescu (Jeffrey Jones).

Jack rescues Gil and pulls him out of the hotel to avoid further embarrassment. Both then take off for their hotel. Seeing them leave, a gypsy woman named Madame Morovia (Inge Appelt) orders her male companion to bring them to her.

Jack and Gil arrive at their hotel, which resembles a 17th-century castle, complete with a gated entrance, but adorned with an "Opening Soon!" banner and signs denoting the acceptance of credit cards. They are met at the gate by Fejos (Michael Richards), a butler with an odd sense of humor. They meet for brunch with Lepescu, where they also meet Radu (John Byner), his hunched-over manservant who addresses everyone as "master" and his wife Lupi (Carol Kane).

Both Gil and Jack learn that something is amiss about Transylvania, despite being laughed off by the locals, including Inspector Percek (Božidar Smiljanić), head of the local police. After meeting Morovia, who tells them they must continue their pursuit, they encounter a series of real-life horror creatures, including a Wolfman Larry (Donald Gibb), a nymphomaniac vampire Odette (Geena Davis), and a swamp monster Twisto that grabs Gil by the crotch as he tries to escape a frightening face-to-face confrontation with the object of their mission himself.

They eventually learn of a Sicilian doctor, Victorio Malavaqua (Joseph Bologna), who lost his license to practice medicine. Finding out that Malavaqua has been giving care in a sanitorium, Gil tries to go there to make an appointment but is rebuffed by the guard. Gil eventually sneaks in and finds Percek and Malavaqua talking about the latter's "experiments", including one involving a patient, Kurt Hunyadi, that fits the description of the Frankenstein monster, which Malavaqua claimed had died. An exhumation of the body later proves otherwise.

Gil learns that Radu is in cahoots with Malavaqua, serving as his lab assistant. Malavaqua also displays a tendency towards madness when within the confines of his laboratory, but returns to normal when he leaves it. It is later revealed, as Gil and Jack go on a search for Elizabeth's missing daughter Laura, that not only has Malavaqua faked Hunyadi's death, but is also his creator, along with that of Odette, Larry, and Twisto. It is also revealed that Malavaqua has engaged in this type of bizarre work to clear his family's name.

The story ties together after Jack is attacked by the Wolfman. In an attempt to rescue Jack, Gil pulls him off Jack, only to be carted off by the Wolfman. The police arrive, but refuse to listen to Jack's story and order him put in the local police lockup. Elizabeth rescues him and learns that the entire police force is at the wine festival instead of searching for her missing daughter. Jack heads off to Malavaqua's lab and Elizabeth goes to the festival. As she is being hauled away by police after confronting Percek, the town is horrified as the monster returns in the flesh, carrying Laura in his arms. Perceived to be dead, it is later learned she was just sleeping.

Jack and Gil arrive, having confronted Malavaqua, and explain Malavaqua's actions to the townspeople, that Malavaqua was legitimately trying to create normal lives for those seen as outcasts or freaks by the townspeople, who now welcome them with open arms.

Finding out that the story is even bigger than what they bargained for, Gil takes enough pictures and both gather enough material to last weeks for the tabloid. They more than make up for their failures and Mac gets his banner headline.

Cast 
 Jeff Goldblum as Jack Harrison
 Joseph Bologna as Dr. Malavaqua
 Ed Begley Jr. as Gil Turner
 Carol Kane as Lupi
 Jeffrey Jones as Mayor Lepescu
 John Byner as Radu
 Geena Davis as Odette
 Michael Richards as Fejos
 Donald Gibb as Larry the Wolfman
 Norman Fell as Mac Turner
 Teresa Ganzel as Elizabeth Ellison
 Rudy De Luca as Lawrence Malbot
 Inge Appelt as Madame Morovia
 Božidar Smiljanić as Inspector Percek

Production
The film was first announced in 1980 under Krofft International, but no progress occurred. Rudy De Luca, Arnie Fishman, and Paul Lichtman unsuccessfully tried to sell the film to New World Pictures for five years. The studio only expressed interest after producers Mace Neufeld and Thomas H. Brodek entered the project. New World Pictures secured financing for the film from the Dow Chemical Company, a company rarely associated with filmmaking. Yugoslav law at the time prevented the company from repatriating funds that it had accumulated in the Yugoslav dinar. To free these frozen funds, Dow decided to use them to invest in a film production inside the country.

According to the DVD commentary from director Rudy De Luca, most of the film was shot on location in Yugoslavia, using local actors. Filming locations included Zagreb, Samobor, and Mokrice Castle. De Luca also mentioned in the commentary that it was the tallest cast he had ever worked with, with Goldblum, Begley, Jones, Davis, Gibb, and Richards all standing over six feet tall.

Release
The film was released theatrically in the United States by New World Pictures on November 8, 1985.  It grossed $2,507,542 for the weekend, finishing in fifth place. Overall, it grossed $7,196,872 at the United States and Canada box office against a $3 million budget, making it a modest box office success.

It received mainly negative reviews from critics. The film scores an 18% with 11 ratings at Rotten Tomatoes. Entertainment Tonight critic Leonard Maltin gave a notable one-word review of the film. His review began with him swaying along with the Glenn Miller recording; at the point in the song where the words "Pennsylvania 6-5000" are uttered, Maltin spoke the title of the film, followed by the word "stinks." In a later interview with Film Threat magazine, Maltin stated he felt his review was complete and also categorized it as one of the reviews he was most proud of and most remembered for.

Home media
The film was released on DVD in the United States by Anchor Bay Entertainment in 2004. It was released on BluRay by Kino Lorber under their Studio Classics banner in 2019.

References

External links

1985 films
1980s comedy horror films
1985 horror films
American comedy horror films
American parody films
American werewolf films
Vampire comedy films
Frankenstein films
English-language Yugoslav films
Yugoslav comedy horror films
Romania in fiction
Jadran Film films
Films produced by Mace Neufeld
Films scored by Lee Holdridge
Films shot in Croatia
Films shot in Slovenia
Films shot in Yugoslavia
New World Pictures films
Films set in Transylvania
Parodies of horror
1980s parody films
1985 comedy films
American vampire films
Films about journalists
Films with screenplays by Rudy De Luca
Films directed by Rudy De Luca
1980s English-language films
1980s American films